The Xiaolangdi Dam (Chinese: 小浪底; Pinyin: Xiǎolàngdǐ) is a dam in Jiyuan, Henan Province, China, and impounds the Yellow River. The facility is located about 20 km to the northwest of Luoyang. It cost US$3.5 billion to construct.

See also 

 List of conventional hydroelectric power stations
 List of power stations in China

References 

Hydroelectric power stations in Henan
Dams in China
Dams on the Yellow River
Dams completed in 2000